The 2012 Siberia Cup was a professional tennis tournament played on hard courts. It was the first edition of the tournament which was part of the 2012 ATP Challenger Tour. It took place in Tyumen, Russia between 19 and 25 November 2012.

Singles main-draw entrants

Seeds

 1 Rankings are as of November 12, 2012.

Other entrants
The following players received wildcards into the singles main draw:
  Vladislav Dubinsky
  Anton Manegin
  Nigmat Shofayziyev
  Robert Ziganshin

The following players received entry from the qualifying draw:
  Sergey Betov
  Aliaksandr Bury
  Egor Gerasimov
  Valery Rudnev
  Michal Schmid (lucky loser)

Champions

Singles

 Evgeny Donskoy def.  Illya Marchenko, 6–7(6–8), 6–3, 6–2

Doubles

 Ivo Klec /  Andreas Siljeström def.  Konstantin Kravchuk /  Denys Molchanov, 6–3, 6–2

External links

2012 ATP Challenger Tour
2012
2012 in Russian tennis
November 2012 sports events in Russia